Mulsantina hudsonica, the Hudsonian lady beetle, is a species of lady beetle in the family Coccinellidae. It is found in North America. It measures  in length. It has been recorded from various conifers and from willow; it is a predator of the balsam woolly adelgid (Adelges piceae).

References

Further reading

 

Coccinellidae
Beetles of North America
Beetles described in 1899
Taxa named by Thomas Lincoln Casey Jr.
Articles created by Qbugbot